Samuel Morrison is a Chilean Anglican bishop. He is the first Bishop of Valparaíso in the 40th and newest Province, Chile.

References

21st-century Anglican bishops in South America
Living people
Chilean Anglicans
Anglican bishops of Valparaíso
Year of birth missing (living people)